Matt Levett is an Australian actor known for his recurring role in the Australian period drama A Place to Call Home. Levett is also notable for his role in the 2014 mini series Devil's Playground; where he portrayed Brendan Mahony.

Career
Matt Levett had guest roles in the television series The Cooks and All Saints in 2005 and Home and Away and Two Twisted in 2006. He graduated from the Western Australian Academy of Performing Arts (WAAPA) in 2009.

He first on screen role was in the highly controversial Australian short Boys Grammar opposite Jai Courtney and Adam J. Yeend. His first supporting role in a TV series was in Bed of Roses as Sean Smithwick. This was followed by a role in Winners and Losers as Spencer Campbell and Dance Academy as Brick.

Matt Levett's short film Unwanted Middle Son was a finalist in the 2012 Tropfest short film festival.

His best known role is as Andrew Swanson in television drama series A Place To Call Home from 2013 and a role in the miniseries Devil's Playground in 2014. In 2015, he was awarded the prestigious Heath Ledger Scholarship in Los Angeles. In 2016, he joined the cast of The Secret Daughter.

References

External links

Australian male television actors
Living people
Place of birth missing (living people)
Year of birth missing (living people)